WVPB is a public radio formatted broadcast radio station licensed to Charleston, West Virginia, serving West-Central West Virginia. WVPB is owned and operated by West Virginia Educational Broadcasting Authority. It is the flagship radio station for West Virginia Public Broadcasting.

Until July 14, 2014, the station held the call sign WVPN.

WVPB is licensed to broadcast a HD (digital hybrid) signal.

References

External links
West Virginia Public Broadcasting Online

NPR member stations
VPB